Ernst Alm (March 1, 1900 in Norsjö – October 7, 1980) was a Swedish cross-country skier who competed in the 1924 Winter Olympics. He finished sixth in the 50 km event. Alm also won the first Vasaloppet in 1922 and is still the youngest to have done so.

Cross-country skiing results

Olympic Games

References

External links

1900 births
1980 deaths
People from Norsjö Municipality
Cross-country skiers from Västerbotten County
Swedish male cross-country skiers
Olympic cross-country skiers of Sweden
Cross-country skiers at the 1924 Winter Olympics